David Trainer (July 9, 1814 - April 7, 1890) was an American textile manufacturer and banker from Chester, Pennsylvania.

Early life
David Trainer was born to David and Mary (Newlin) Trainer on July 9, 1814.

Career
In 1837, Trainer, in association with John Haistings, Jr., changed the Old Price Grist Mill, which was owned by Trainer's father into a cotton factory.

In 1842, the partnership between Trainer and John Haistings, Jr. was dissolved and Trainer took over full ownership of the company.

Trainer owned the "Linwood Mills", one of the largest textile factories in the region.  In 1851, the Trainer Mill was destroyed by fire, but by 1852 it was replaced by a new 3 1/2 story mill.  Mill #2 was built in 1869 and Mill #3 in 1873.

Trainer was a director of the Delaware County National Bank and served as the third president from 1874 to 1875.  Trainer was re-elected president but declined the position.

Personal life

Trainer was twice married.  His first wife was Ellen Eyre and together they had seven children.  Mrs. Trainer died in March, 1872.

Trainer was a churchwarden of the St. Martin's Church in Marcus Hook, Pennsylvania.

Trainer is interred at the Chester Rural Cemetery.

Legacy
The borough of Trainer, Pennsylvania is named after Trainer.

References

1814 births
1890 deaths
19th-century American businesspeople
American bankers
Burials at Chester Rural Cemetery
American textile industry businesspeople
People from Chester, Pennsylvania
People from Delaware County, Pennsylvania